, is a private university located in Higashiyodogawa-ku, Osaka, Japan.

History 
It was founded in 1932 as Naniwa Higher Commercial School (浪華高等商業学校). A few years later, difficulties fell upon the school and it was about to be abolished. In 1935, with the large donation by Dr. Iwao Kokusho (黒正巌, 1895–1949), the school was revived as Showa Higher Commercial School (昭和高等商業学校).

During World War II, most of the students were enlisted. So in 1944 Osaka Women's College of Economics (大阪女子経済専門学校) was established instead. In 1946, after the war, the school was reorganized into Osaka College of Economics (大阪経済専門学校), a co-educational school.

In 1949, under Japan's new educational systems, Osaka College of Economics was developed into four-year Osaka University of Economics.

At first OUE had one faculty: Faculty of Economics. OUE added faculties as follows:
1964: Faculty of Business Administration
1966: Graduate School (Master's degree course in Economics)
1968: Doctoral degree course in Economics
1997: Faculty of Information Management
2002: Faculty of Human Sciences

Faculties (undergraduate schools) 
 Economics
 Business Administration
 Information Management
 Human Sciences

Graduate schools 
 Economics (Master's course/Doctor's course)
 Business Administration (Master's course only)
 Business Information Systems (Master's course only)
 Human Sciences (Master's course only)

Institutes 
 Institute for Research in Economic History of Japan
 established in 1933 by Dr. Kokusho
 Institute of Small Business Research and Business Administration

References

External links
 Official Website

Private universities and colleges in Japan
Universities and colleges in Osaka
Higashiyodogawa-ku, Osaka
Kansai Collegiate American Football League